The discography of American alternative rock band AFI consists of eleven studio albums, one live album, one compilation album, one video album, twelve extended plays, twenty-two singles and twenty-two music videos.

Albums

Studio albums

Live albums

Compilation albums

Video albums

Extended plays

Promos and splits

Singles

Promotional singles

Music videos

Other appearances

List of songs recorded by AFI

Notes

References

External links
Official website
AFI at AllMusic

Rock music group discographies
Discographies of American artists
Discography